Great Western Hospitals NHS Foundation Trust runs the Great Western Hospital, a large hospital situated in Swindon, Wiltshire, England, next to junction 15 of the M4 motorway.

Performance 

In the ratings produced by the Healthcare Commission for 2005/2006, the trust scored "good" for the quality of services but "weak" for the management of resources.

In 2006 it was announced that the trust would be axing up to 200 jobs, 99 of which were likely to involve redundancy.

The Trust was one of the first to use the Picture archiving and communication system film-less x-rays, as part of the NHS's National Programme for IT.

It recorded a deficit of £17.4 million in 2013/4 and was expecting to end 2014/5 with a £2.9m deficit, provoking an investigation by Monitor.  The Chief Executive said they had to manage a 15% increase in unplanned activity compared to last year, around 300 more unplanned patients each month.  The conclusion of the investigation was that the organisation  did not have a robust financial recovery plan or a strategy to ensure it continues to provide services for patients in the long term.  It expects a deficit of £14 million for 2015/6.

In March 2016, 49 emergency patients at the trust waited more than 12 hours to be allocated a bed. This was the second highest figure for any trust in England.

Facilities 
The hospital building was built under the Private Finance Initiative and is owned by Semperian PPP Investment Partners which has a contract with Carillion to provide facilities such as catering and housekeeping.  Since December 2011, Carillion has been in an industrial relations dispute with the GMB (trade union) which represents housekeeping staff about holiday entitlement, working practices, and other allegations. This dispute has resulted in about 50 Employment Tribunal claims lodged against Carillion by their own staff.  In September 2014 the Trust Board considered a report on the implications of this dispute which concluded "The Trust has lost confidence in Carillion’s ability to resolve these issues and the Trust continues to pursue all means necessary to ensure they remain focused on addressing them....Concerns about food hygiene and cleanliness, have posed a potential risk to patients, visitors and staff which is completely unacceptable....as a PFI hospital, the contract for provision is extremely complicated."

The trust started using an Electronic Prescribing and Medicines Administration which was developed in-house in June 2015. It improves patient safety by giving automatic warnings about allergic reactions, drug interactions and prescribing guidelines.  It also speeds up patient discharge and the flow of patients from the Emergency Department.

In 2022 a new urgent treatment centre, a radiotherapy centre built in partnership with Oxford University Hospitals NHS Foundation Trust and an energy centre with air source heat pumps, were built.  In 2024 there are plans for a rehabilitation centre, a private healthcare facility, a medical equipment sterilisation unit, a mental health facility, and cancer service building.

See also
 Emergency medical services in the United Kingdom
 List of NHS trusts

References

External links
Great Western Hospitals NHS Foundation Trust

NHS foundation trusts
Health in Wiltshire
Swindon